The Urbana Monument Square Historic District is a historic district at the center of Urbana, Ohio, United States.  Since Urbana's earliest days, this portion of the city has been a public square in the heart of the city's business district.  Among the buildings in the district are examples of the Federal, Georgian, Italianate, Richardsonian Romanesque, and Second Empire styles of architecture.  In 1984, the district was listed on the National Register of Historic Places because of its architecture and its contribution to local history.  Approximately  are included within the landmarked area, which is composed of 66 contributing properties, and which also includes 13 non-contributing properties.

References

National Register of Historic Places in Champaign County, Ohio
Urbana, Ohio
U.S. Route 68
Geography of Champaign County, Ohio
Squares in Ohio
Historic districts on the National Register of Historic Places in Ohio